Tour Adria (also known as tour Technip) is an office skyscraper located in La Défense, the high-rise business district situated west of Paris, France. It has a triangular floorplan.

Built in 2002 by Michel Andrault and Nicolas Ayoub, architects from Conceptua, it is a twin of the nearby Tour Égée, which was built three years before in 1999. The only difference between both towers consists in their cladding: the one from Égée is white when the one from Adria is darker with windows looking like vertical glass stripes. Tour Adria is 155 m (509 ft) tall.

Since its construction it has been occupied by the French engineering company Technip as its group headquarters.

See also 
 Skyscraper
 La Défense
 List of tallest structures in Paris

External links 
 Tour Adria (Emporis)
 Tour Adria (Insecula)
 Technip Group

Adria
Adria
Office buildings completed in 2002
Twin towers
2002 establishments in France
Buildings and structures completed in 2002
21st-century architecture in France